Major Publications, also known as Major Magazines, was the publisher of the satirical magazine Cracked, the most durable imitator of Mad magazine. Founded by Robert C. Sproul in 1958, the company generally imitated other publishers' successes in various genres, such as Westerns, men's adventure, and the Warren Publications mid-1960s revival of horror comics. Even as the company chased publishing trends, its long-running flagship title was Cracked, which the company published from 1958 to 1985.

The company also published a number of monster-themed magazines, imitating publications like Fangoria and Famous Monsters of Filmland. Editor Terry Bisson recalled:

History

Cracked 

Cracked's first editor was Sol Brodsky. Over the years, Bill Ward and John Severin were regular contributors to most of the company's publications. The production manager throughout the 1960s was Charles Foster.

In addition to the flagship title, Major put out a number of publications under the Cracked umbrella, including Cracked Collector's Edition, Giant Cracked, and Super Cracked. Many Cracked contributors worked on these titles.

Web of Horror 
The most notable of Major's black-and-white horror magazines was Web of Horror, edited by Bisson, which published three issues from 1969 to 1970. Bruce Jones made his professional debut in Web of Horror #3, writing and drawing the six-page story "Point of View." Wayne Howard contributed to issue #1. Syd Shores penciled "Blood Thirst!" in #1 and "Strangers!" in #3. Ralph Reese was a regular contributor to Web of Horror. Other contributors included Bernie Wrightson, Michael Kaluta, and Jeff Jones.

Bisson left after issue #3, leaving the editorial chores to Wrightson and Bruce Jones. As Wrightson recalls,

Sale to Globe Communications 
In 1985, founder Sproul sold the company's assets to Globe Communications, which moved the operations to Florida and continued to published Cracked and some of its affiliated magazines under the Major Magazines name. Globe sold the assets to American Media in 1994.

Titles published 
 Cracked titles:
 Cracked (212 issues, Feb./Mar. 1958–July 1985) — sold to Globe Communications
 Biggest Greatest Cracked (21 issues, 1965–Fall 1986)
 Cracked Collector's Edition (58 issues, 1973–February 1985)
 Cracked Digest (5 issues, Oct. 1986–Oct. 1987)
 Cracked Goes to the Movies (1 issue, 1971)
 Cracked Shut-Ups 2 issues, 1971)
 Extra Special Cracked (9 issues, 1976–Winter 1986)
 Giant Cracked (48 issues, 1965–Winter 1989)
 King-Sized Cracked (20 issues, 1967–Summer 1986)
 Super Cracked (32 issues, 1968–Fall 1986)
 Monster Howls (1 issue, 1966) — Humor-Vision imprint
 Monsters Attack (5 issues, 1989–1990) — Globe Communications imprint 
 Pow Magazine (3 issues, 1966–1967) — Humor-Vision imprint
 Web of Horror (3 issues, Dec. 1969–Apr. 1970)

References

Notes

Sources consulted 

 
 

Defunct comics and manga publishing companies
Magazine publishing companies of the United States
Publishing companies established in 1958
1958 establishments in New York (state)
1994 disestablishments in Florida